A Brand New Me is the fourth solo album of James "J.T." Taylor. It includes the song "How", which was released as a maxi-single. This album was released by Interscope Records on June 6, 2000.

Track listing

References

External links
 
 James "J.T." Taylor at Discogs
 Official Website
 Facebook Page
 My Space Page

2000 albums
James "J.T." Taylor albums